This is a list of worker cooperatives by country.

Asia

India 
 Amul
 Indian Coffee House
 Lijjat
 Milma
 Uralungal Labour Contract Co-operative Society - A worker co-operative in the state of Kerala that builds infrastructure projects
 Co-optex
 Nilenso - Employee owned technology co-operative in the state of Karnataka

Oceania

Australia 

 CBH Group
 Norco Co-operative

New Zealand 
 Loomio

Europe

Denmark 

 Arla
Danish Agro
Danish Crown
DLG
Kopenhagen Fur

France 
 Motion Twin, video game studio
 Les-Tilleuls.coop, information technology services and consulting company, editor of the API Platform web framework

Italy 

The cooperative movement in Emilia-Romagna, Italy, successfully melds two divergent philosophical currents: Socialism and Catholicism. With more than a century of cooperative history, the region includes more than 8,000 cooperatives.

Spain 
 Igalia
 Irizar
 Mondragon Corporation

Switzerland 

 Umantis

United Kingdom 

 AK Press
 Edinburgh Bicycle Co-operative, Edinburgh
 Eighth Day, Manchester
 EthosVO Ltd, Surrey
 Greencity Wholefoods
 Highland Wholefoods Workers Co-operative, Inverness
 John Lewis Partnership, nationwide
 Scott Bader
 Suma
 Swann Morton
 Unicorn Grocery, Manchester

Middle East

Israel 
 Egged, transport cooperative society

North America

Canada 

 Come As You Are, Toronto, ON
 G7 Welcoming Committee Records
 Mondragon Bookstore & Coffeehouse (defunct), Winnipeg, MB

Mexico 
 Cooperativa Tierra Común
 Luz y Fuerza (Sindicato Mexicano de Electricistas) 
 Zapatista coffee cooperatives, Chiapas

United States 

3 Cross Fermentation Cooperative, Worcester, MA
A Slice of New York, San Jose, CA
Access Cooperative, Grafton, MA
Agaric Technology Collective, Boston, MA
AK Press, Chico, CA
Alvarado Street Bakery, Petaluma, CA
 Baltimore Bicycle Works, Baltimore, MD
BreadHive Bakery & Cafe, Buffalo, NY
Breitenbush Hot Springs, Detroit, OR
Burial Grounds Cooperative, Olympia, WA
Business Services Cooperative, Olympia WA
C4 Tech & Design, New Orleans, LA
Capital Homecare Cooperative, Olympia, WA 
Casa Nueva Restaurant, Cantina & Bodega, Athens, OH
Cheese Board Collective, Berkeley, CA
Citybikes Workers' Cooperative, Portland, OR
Codeversant, Madison, WI
CoLab Cooperative, Ithaca, NY and worldwide
Collective Copies, several locations near Amherst, MA
Community Pharmacy, Madison, WI
Cooperative Home Care Associates, Bronx, NY, established 1985, the US' largest worker owned co-op 
District Sentinel, Washington, DC
Dollars and Sense, Boston, MA
Earth Designs Cooperative, Rosendale, NY 
Equal Exchange, West Bridgewater, MA
Evergreen Cooperatives, Cleveland, OH
Future Focus Media Cooperative, Worcester, MA 
Green Worker Cooperatives, The Bronx, NY
Hard Times Café, Minneapolis, MN
Hoedads Reforestation Cooperative, Eugene, OR
Inkworks Press, Berkeley, CA
Interpreters' Cooperative of Madison, Madison, WI
Isthmus Engineering and Manufacturing, Madison, WI
Just Coffee Cooperative, Madison, WI
Le Voyeur, Olympia, WA
Little Grill Collective, Harrisonburg, VA
Little Weaver Web Collective, distributed, USA 
Lucy Parsons Center, Boston, MA
Marine Survey & Assessments, Port Townsend, WA
Maybeck High School, Berkeley, CA
Means TV, Detroit, MI
Mintwood Media Collective P.R. Firm (defunct), Washington, DC
Movement Cooperative, NYC, NY 
Nature's Bakery Cooperative, Madison, WI
New Era Windows, Chicago, IL
NOVA Web Development, Arlington, VA
Olio Culinary Collective, Boston, MA
Outformations, Oakland, CA
Olympia Food Co-op, Olympia, WA
Orca Books Cooperative, Olympia, WA
Patty Pan Grill, Shoreline, WA
Pedal People Cooperative, Northampton, MA
Pelham Auto Parts, Belchertown, MA
Pioneer Valley Photovoltaics, Greenfield, MA and New Britain, CT
Rabble Rouser, Montpelier, VT
Rainbow Grocery Cooperative, San Francisco, CA
Real Pickles Cooperative, Greenfield, MA
Red and Black Cafe, Portland, OR—CLOSED
Red Emma's Bookstore Coffeehouse, Baltimore, MD
Red Raven Espresso Parlor, Fargo, ND
Sassafras Tech Collective, Ann Arbor, MI
Seward Community Cafe, Minneapolis, MN
Staffing Cooperative
Story 2 Designs, Seattle, WA
SymbiOp Garden Shop & Landscaping, Portland, OR
The Drivers Cooperative, New York City, NY
The New School of Montpelier, Montpelier, VT
Union Cab of Madison Cooperative, Madison, WI
WooRides Cooperative, Worcester, MA
Worcester Bookkeeping Cooperative, Worcester, MA
Working Systems, Olympia, WA

South America

Argentina 
 Brukman factory
 FaSinPat

Venezuela 
 Cecosesola

See also

 CICOPA
 List of cooperatives
 United States Federation of Worker Cooperatives
 Worker Cooperative

References

External links
 Find a Coop online searchable database
 For a comprehensive list of UK cooperatives, see the directory of Co-operatives UK.

 
Lists by country
Lists of cooperatives